LeRoy Franklin Abernethy (September 27, 1885 – November 9, 1959) was an American college football player from North Carolina. He played for North Carolina A&M from 1902–04 before transferring to the University of North Carolina for 1905.

NC State

1902–1904
Abernethy played first for North Carolina A&M, selected All-Southern by W. S. Kimberly in 1904.

University of North Carolina
Abernethy was a prominent fullback for the North Carolina Tar Heels football team of the University of North Carolina. He was selected for the position on an all-time Carolina football team of Dr. R. B. Lawson in 1934. On the all time team of Joel Whitaker he was noted as the "probably the best line plunger that has ever been."

1905
He was selected All-Southern by coach R. R. Brown of Washington and Lee University. A fullback did not score three touchdowns again for UNC until Mike Faulkerson in 1992.

Later life
By 1910, Abernethy was engaged in the hardware business in his hometown of Hickory.

He later moved to  Asheville, where he was a PurÖl distributor 
and then owner of the Hall-Sell Petroleum Carrier company. During World War II, he helped organize Petroleum Carriers Associates, an emergency oil transport unit, originally named the War Emergency Cooperative Association.  In 1941, he married Frieda Burnett Russell in 1941. 
 
He died in an Asheville hospital in 1959 after suffering a heart attack at home.

References

1885 births
1959 deaths
North Carolina Tar Heels football players
American football fullbacks
NC State Wolfpack football players
All-Southern college football players
People from Asheville, North Carolina
People from Hickory, North Carolina